The Art of Self Defense is the debut studio album by American heavy metal band High on Fire. It was released originally by Man's Ruin Records in 2000.

Track listing
All songs composed by High on Fire unless stated.

Bonus tracks

In 2001, Tee Pee Records re-released the album with different album art and two bonus tracks. One of them being a cover of "The Usurper" by Celtic Frost.

In 2012, Southern Lord Records re-released the album with slightly different cover art than the Man's Ruin Records version and three additional bonus tracks (all from High on Fire's self-titled 1999 demo).

Personnel
Matt Pike – guitar, vocals
Des Kensel – drums
George Rice – bass
Produced by Billy Anderson and High on Fire

References

2000 debut albums
High on Fire albums
Man's Ruin Records albums
Albums produced by Billy Anderson (producer)
Tee Pee Records albums